The 2020–21 LSU Lady Tigers basketball team will represent Louisiana State University during the 2020–21 NCAA Division I women's basketball season. The Lady Tigers, led by tenth-year head coach Nikki Fargas, play their home games at Pete Maravich Assembly Center and compete as members of the Southeastern Conference (SEC).

Preseason

SEC media poll
The SEC media poll was released on November 17, 2020 with the Lady Tigers selected to finish in seventh place in the SEC.

Preseason All-SEC teams
The Lady Tigers had one player selected to the preseason all-SEC teams.

First team

Khayla Pointer

Schedule

|-
!colspan=9 style=| Non-conference regular season

|-
!colspan=9 style=| SEC regular season

|-
!colspan=9 style=| SEC Tournament

References

LSU Lady Tigers basketball seasons
LSU
LSU Lady Tigers
LSU Lady Tigers